The  is a partially tolled expressway in Iburi Subprefecture and Hidaka Subprefecture, Hokkaido, Japan. The expressway connects Hidaka to the Dō-Ō Expressway. It is owned and operated by partially by the East Nippon Expressway Company and the Ministry of Land, Infrastructure, Transport and Tourism (MLIT). It is signed as an auxiliary route of National Route 235 as well as E63 under their "2016 Proposal for Realization of Expressway Numbering.

Naming
The name Hidaka is derived from the province of the same name established in 1869, which in turn was named after an unknown country "in the Eastern wilds" called Hitakami in the Nihonshoki, a history book written in 720.  There is no direct connection between the Hitakami of the Nihonshoki and the modern Hidaka Subprefecture.

Route description

Lane configuration

History

The first section of the Hidaka Expressway to open was a -long section between the western terminus at the Dō-Ō Expressway in Tomakomai and Atsuma in 1998.
In consideration of the effects of the 2011 Tōhoku earthquake and tsunami, it was decided by MLIT that future sections of the expressway should follow a path further inland to avoid inundation by a tsunami. This decision has delayed further construction of the expressway.

The expressway was temporarily closed after being damaged by the 2018 Hokkaido Eastern Iburi earthquake.

Future
Construction of the expressway is to be continued east to the town of Urakawa on the southeastern point of the island of Hokkaido.

Junction list
The entire expressway is in Hokkaido.

References

Expressways in Japan
Roads in Hokkaido